Andrew Harris (born April 24, 1987) is a Canadian professional Canadian football running back for the Toronto Argonauts of the Canadian Football League (CFL). Harris is a four-time Grey Cup champion, two-time winner of the Grey Cup Most Valuable Canadian and one-time Grey Cup Most Valuable Player, as well as a five-time CFL All-Star and a six-time CFL West All-Star. He played for the BC Lions for six seasons before joining the Winnipeg Blue Bombers in 2016 as a free agent, where he was named the 2017 Most Outstanding Canadian after leading the league in rushing and setting the record for single-season receptions by a running back. In 2022, Harris passed 10,000 career rushing yards and became the CFL leader in career yards from scrimmage by a Canadian.

Early years

Harris was born in Winnipeg, Manitoba, and spent his early years in Steinbach, Manitoba, where he started playing football at age 9 with the Eastman Raiders. He is of Barbadian descent through his father. He played high school football at Grant Park High School in Winnipeg through his junior year and transferred to Oak Park High School before his senior year.

Junior career
After high school in Winnipeg, Harris joined the Vancouver Island Raiders of the Canadian Junior Football League. During his junior career, he led the Raiders to three national championships (2006, 2008, and 2009) and broke a number of British Columbia conference and CJFL records, including all-time touchdowns and scoring. In 2009, he was awarded the Wally Buono Award for most outstanding junior football player in Canada.

Professional career

BC Lions
The head coach and general manager of the BC Lions, Wally Buono, took notice of Harris' talents in junior football and claimed him as a territorial exemption on May 22, 2008. On December 15, 2008, the Lions announced that they had signed Harris. He joined the Lions' practice roster in 2009, while continuing to play his final season of junior for the Raiders.

In 2010, Harris earned a spot on the Lions active roster and was primarily used on special teams in his first season.  He was named the CFL's special teams player of the week on September 14, 2010.

Harris began the 2011 season as the Lions' backup running back.  Harris saw his role expand and he took over as the starting running back in mid-season, finishing with 853 total yards and eight touchdowns. In the playoffs, Harris was named the Canadian player of the week for his performance in the Lions' win over the Edmonton Eskimos in the West Division Final.  A week later, Harris was named the Most Outstanding Canadian at the Grey Cup, scoring a touchdown and rushing for 65 yards over 10 carries in the Lions 34–23 win over the Winnipeg Blue Bombers.

On December 29, 2011, Harris and the Lions agreed to a two-year contract extension, with an option for year three.

Following a strong 2011 campaign, Harris became the starting running back for the 2012 CFL season. Harris continued his strong play and became the ninth Canadian running back to rush for 1,000 yards in a season and the first Canadian BC Lion to rush for a 1,000 yards since Sean Millington in 2000. Fellow Canadian running back Jon Cornish also ran for 1,000 yards, marking the first time since 1956 that two Canadian running backs ran for 1,000 yards in the same season.  Despite seeing increased rushing attempts in the 2013 CFL season, his total yards fell short of 1000, finishing with 998. Harris added 61 pass receptions for 513 yards. Prior to the 2014 CFL season Harris and the Lions agreed to a contract extension through the 2015 CFL season.

Harris's 2014 campaign was cut short by injuries, missing the final six games of the season due to injury. He finished the season with 652 yards on 122 carries (5.3 average) with two rushing touchdowns. He added 529 receiving yards on 46 catches with four touchdowns. Harris finished the 2015 CFL season with the second most rushing yards, trailing Montreal's Tyrell Sutton by 20 yards (1,059 to 1,039). He set a career-high in rushing attempts with 222, while simultaneously posting a career worst 4.7 yards per carry. Immediately following playoff elimination as a pending free-agent, Harris expressed his displeasure with the BC Lions organization, putting his future with the club in doubt.

Winnipeg Blue Bombers
Harris signed with his hometown Winnipeg Blue Bombers as a free agent on February 9, 2016. During the 2016 season Harris played in all but 3 of the regular season games for the Blue Bombers, missing some time with an ankle injury. He finished the season third in the league in rushing yards, falling short of the 1,000 yard plateau by only 26 yards. In a game against the Edmonton Eskimos in 2017, Harris set a professional first by surpassing 100 yards in both rushing and receiving, netting a total of 225 yards in the game. He finished the season with 1,035 rushing yards, winning his first league rushing title. He also led all players with the most receptions, with 105, which was also a record for running backs, with the previous record of 102 held by Craig Ellis. Harris's strong play was rewarded in May 2018 when he and the Bombers agreed to a two-year contract extension. In 2018, he set a career-high for rushing yards and once again led the league in rushing with 1390 yards. 

During the 2019 CFL season, Harris surpassed the 8,000 rushing yard mark for his career, in a game against the Argonauts at home. On August 15, 2019, Harris became the all-time leader in yards from scrimmage by a Canadian player, surpassing Ben Cahoon's 13,368 yards from scrimmage. In the same game, he passed Dave Thelen and entered the top ten all-time in rushing yards. Harris is the only player in league history to record over 4000 rushing yards with two different teams. On August 26, 2019 Harris was suspended two games by the league for violating the CFL/CFLPA drug policy after testing positive for Metandienone. In Winnipeg's final regular season game, Harris broke the record previously held by Normie Kwong for career rushing yards by a Canadian player in the CFL; the play on which he broke the record set up Winnipeg's game winning field goal over Calgary.

Despite winning the CFL rushing title by more than 300 yards Harris was not selected as a team nominee for either Most Outstanding Player (Willie Jefferson), or Most Outstanding Canadian (Mike Miller). Miller's nomination caused controversy; as mostly a special teams player, Miller's statistical output was far below Harris's. Miller was the team co-leader for special teams tackles with 25, and with only 10 yards rushing and 63 yards receiving, Miller was outgained by Harris in terms of yards from scrimmage by a combined 1,836 yards. Miller himself stated his belief that Harris was the best Canadian player on the Blue Bombers by writing, “I will accept the Canadian nomination on Andrew’s behalf, but do so reluctantly and while completely disagreeing with his omission.” Voter Ted Wyman wrote a piece stating that Harris's positive test for a banned substance prevented Wyman from giving Harris a vote. Meanwhile, Bob Irving, a local radio announcer and the lone voter for Harris defended him; “I believe that a 2-game suspension, 2 missed game cheques and public embarrassment in July was punishment enough—I proudly voted for him.”

Harris helped the underdog Blue Bombers win their first Grey Cup since 1990 against the Hamilton Tiger-Cats in the 107th Grey Cup game. He became the first ever player to win Most Valuable Player and Most Valuable Canadian in Grey Cup history after he recorded 18 carries for 134 rushing yards, five catches for 35 receiving yards, and both a rushing touchdown and a receiving touchdown. Following the win of his hometown team Harris said "I'm so proud to be a Winnipegger and I can't wait to get back and share this with all them. I just wanted to prove it to my teammates and deliver for them. Everything else, whatever. I just wanted to be the best player I could be today."

Harris did not play in 2020 as the 2020 CFL season was cancelled. On January 15, 2021, it was announced that Harris had signed a one-year contract extension with the Blue Bombers. Harris missed the first three games of the season with a calf injury. He played in six games in the middle of the regular season, carrying the ball 116 times for 623 yards with three touchdowns. On October 22, 2021 the Bombers announced that they had placed Harris on the six-game injured list because of a knee injury he suffered when he scored a touchdown against the Edmonton Eskimos. Harris would not play for the rest of season until the 2021 Western Division Finals. In the West Division Finals, Harris carried the team to their second consecutive Grey Cup as he had 136 yards rushing and a TD as the Bombers ended the Roughriders year for the third consecutive season. He became a free agent upon the expiry of his contract on February 8, 2022.

Toronto Argonauts
On February 8, 2022, Harris agreed to terms with the Toronto Argonauts after spending six seasons with the Winnipeg Blue Bombers. In his fifth game with the Argonauts, on July 24, 2022, he became the sixth player in CFL history to rush for over 10,000 yards and is the only Canadian player to accomplish the feat. On August 16, 2022, mid-way through the 2022 season, it was initially announced that Harris would be out for the next 4–6 weeks with a torn pectoral muscle, however the following day it was announced he would miss the remainder of the season after undergoing surgery. At the time of the injury, Harris had played in eight games for the Argos and was third in the league in rushing yards with 490. Harris returned to the active roster in the East Division Final vs. the Montreal Alouettes and scored his first touchdown with the Argonauts. One week later, Harris helped Toronto win the 109th Grey Cup by defeating his former team, the Blue Bombers. On March 2, 2023, it was announced that Harris had re-signed with the Argonauts

Career statistics

Personal

Harris cites his idols as former Winnipeg Blue Bombers running back Charles Roberts, and hockey player Steve Yzerman. Since joining the Lions and his following move to the Bombers, Harris has worn #33 as a tribute to a Vancouver Island Raiders teammate who died in a car crash in September 2008. Harris has a daughter and continues to make Winnipeg his home during the off-season. In November 2015, Harris bought Koncept nightclub in Nanaimo, British Columbia from Nanaimo city councilor Jerry Hong.

References

External links

Toronto Argonauts bio 
BC Lions bio

1987 births
Living people
BC Lions players
Black Canadian players of Canadian football
Canadian football running backs
Canadian Junior Football League players
Canadian people of Barbadian descent
Players of Canadian football from Manitoba
Canadian football people from Winnipeg
Toronto Argonauts players
Winnipeg Blue Bombers players
Canadian Football League Most Outstanding Canadian Award winners